Amphora is a major genus of marine and freshwater diatoms.  With over 1000 species, it is one of the largest genera of diatoms. These diatoms are recognized by their strongly dorsiventral frustules, which means that their ridges lie close to the ventral margin of the valve, and their girdle is much wider on the dorsal side.

Species
The following species are known:

A

Amphora abludens R.Simonsen
Amphora absoluta Levkov
Amphora accomoda Levkov
Amphora acuta W.Gregory
Amphora acuta var. japonica 
Amphora acuta var. labyrinthica (Grunow) Cleve
Amphora acuta var. media Heiden
Amphora acuta var. minor Foged
Amphora acuta var. neogena 
Amphora acuta var. parva A.H.Wachnicka & E.E.Gaiser
Amphora acutissima M.H.Giffen
Amphora acutiuscula f. branderi R.Tynni
Amphora acutiuscula var. fossilis Pantocsek
Amphora acutiuscula var. neglecta R.d'Aubert
Amphora acutiuscula var. parvula K.S.Mereschkowsky
Amphora adumbrata M.H.Hohn & J.Hellerman
Amphora advena S.L.Van Landingham
Amphora aegaea Ehrenberg
Amphora aequalis Krammer
Amphora aestuarii Cleve
Amphora affiniformis Levkov
Amphora affinis Kützing
Amphora africana H.Heiden
Amphora africana var. undulata H.Heiden
Amphora agapica N.A.Skabichevskaya
Amphora ajajensis Skabichevskii (Skabitschevsky)
Amphora alaeziarum Álvarez-Blanco & S.Blanco
Amphora alata H.Peragallo
Amphora alata Pomazkina & E.V.Rodionova
Amphora alata var. aptera Cleve
Amphora alata var. major Cleve
Amphora aliformis J.G.Stepanek, S. Mayama & Kociolek
Amphora allanta M.H.Hohn & J.Hellerman
Amphora alpestris Levkov
Amphora alpha Karsten
Amphora alternata A.Mann
Amphora alveolata G.Leuduger-Fortmorel
Amphora ambigua Meister
Amphora americana A.H.Wachnicka & E.E.Gaiser
Amphora amoena Hustedt
Amphora amphioxys Bailey
Amphora ampla Ehrenberg
Amphora anceps A.Mann
Amphora andesitica Pantocsek
Amphora angularis var. caspica N.I.Karaeva
Amphora angularis var. delicatula A.I.Proshkina-Lavrenko
Amphora angulosa var. ceylanica Skvortzov
Amphora angusta W.Gregory
Amphora angusta f. minuta Grunow
Amphora angusta var. adeliae Manguin
Amphora angusta var. angustissima H.F.Van Heurck
Amphora angusta var. arctica Grunow
Amphora angusta var. ceylanics Skvortzov
Amphora angusta var. chinensis Skvortzow (Skvortsov)
Amphora angusta var. diducta (A.W.F.Schmidt) Cleve
Amphora angusta var. glaberrima Grunow
Amphora angusta var. gracilenta Grunow ex A.W.F.Schmidt
Amphora angusta var. incurvata (J.-J.Brun) Cleve
Amphora angusta var. oblongella (Grunow) Cleve
Amphora angusta var. oblongella (Grunow) Cleve
Amphora angusta var. okamurae Skvortzov
Amphora angusta var. orientalis A.A.Aleem
Amphora angusta var. sinensis Skvortzov
Amphora angusta var. typica Cleve
Amphora angusta var. typica f. depressa Skvortzov
Amphora angusta var. ventricosa f. japonica Skvortzov
Amphora angusta var. zebrina (A.W.F.Schmidt) Cleve
Amphora angustissima (H.F.Van Heurck) A.Mann
Amphora angustissima H.Heiden
Amphora antiqua Cleve & Grove
Amphora aponina f. major G.Rabenhorst
Amphora araucariana Frenguelli
Amphora araulensis Héribaud-Joseph
Amphora arcana M.H.Giffen
Amphora archibaldii A.H.Wachnicka & E.E.Gaiser
Amphora arcta A.W.F.Schmidt
Amphora arcuata A.W.F.Schmidt
Amphora arcuatoides Ognjanova, Metzeltin & Levkov
Amphora arcus W.Gregory
Amphora arcus f. typica Cleve
Amphora arcus var. major Maurice Peragallo
Amphora arcus var. sulcata Cleve
Amphora arenaria Donkin
Amphora arenaria var. donkinii Rabenhorst
Amphora arenaria var. rattrayi Cleve
Amphora arenicola Grunow ex Cleve
Amphora arenicola var. minor McCall
Amphora arenicola var. oculata Cleve
Amphora arenicola var. subaequalis Cleve
Amphora areolata Grunow
Amphora areolata var. curta Cleve & Grove
Amphora areolata var. curta Cleve
Amphora areolata var. elegans M.Peragallo
Amphora areolata var. maxima Cleve & Grove
Amphora areolata var. minor Cleve & Grove
Amphora argus Pantocsek
Amphora ascensionis G.Leuduger-Fortmorel
Amphora aspera Petit
Amphora astuarii Cleve
Amphora athanasii M.Peragallo
Amphora atlantica G.Leuduger-Fortmorel
Amphora atomoides Levkov
Amphora australiensis J.John
Amphora australis P.C.M.Petit
Amphora ayensuensis Foged

B

Amphora baccata A.Mann
Amphora bacillaris Gregory
Amphora baicalensis Skvortzow & K.I.Meyer
Amphora baicalomicra E.V.Rodionova & Pomazkina
Amphora baicalopseudoeximia Pomazkina & E.V.Rodionova
Amphora balatonis Pantocsek
Amphora banyaiana  & Weber
Amphora barrei Manguin
Amphora beaufortiana Hustedt
Amphora behringensis Cleve
Amphora bella Hustedt
Amphora berolinensis N.Abarca & R.Jahn
Amphora berriati var. minor R.d'Aubart
Amphora berriatii Héribaud-Joseph
Amphora beta Karsten
Amphora biarcuata H.Heiden
Amphora biconvexa C.Janisch
Amphora biggiba Grunow
Amphora biggibosa Cleve
Amphora bigibba Grunow
Amphora bigibba var. interrupta (Grunow) Cleve
Amphora bigibbosa Cleve
Amphora binodis W.Gregory
Amphora bioculata Cleve
Amphora birnirkiana Patrick & Freese
Amphora birugula M.H.Hohn
Amphora biseriata W.Gregory
Amphora bistriata G.Leuduger-Fortmorel
Amphora bitumida G.A.Prowse
Amphora bituminosa Pantocsek
Amphora biundulata L.Bérard-Therriault, A.Cardinal, & M.Poulin
Amphora blanda G.Leuduger-Fortmorel
Amphora bongrainii M.Peragallo
Amphora borealis Schumann
Amphora borisii Levkov
Amphora bornatii Héribaud-Joseph
Amphora boryana Pantocsek
Amphora brasiliensis Zimmermann
Amphora brebissonii Maurice Peragallo
Amphora brebissonii var. minor Maurice Peragallo
Amphora brehmii Hustedt
Amphora brevis Levkov
Amphora buczkoae Levkov
Amphora budayana Pantocsek
Amphora bulgarica Ognjanova, Metzeltin & Levkov
Amphora bullata Cleve
Amphora bullosa (Fiorini) Fiorini-Mazzanti

C

Amphora calumetica (Thomas ex Wolle) M.Peragallo
Amphora calumeticoides Cocquyt
Amphora camelus Cleve & Grove
Amphora capensis A.W.F.Schmidt
Amphora capitata F.Meister
Amphora capitata R.Brander
Amphora capitellata Frenguelli
Amphora caribaea A.H.Wachnicka & E.E.Gaiser
Amphora carinata Ehrenberg
Amphora catharinaria B.J.Cholnoky
Amphora caucasica Peragallo M.
Amphora ceylanensis G.Lauduger-Fortmorel
Amphora chadzhibeiensis Gusliakov
Amphora charcotii M.Peragallo
Amphora charrua Metzeltin, Lange-Bertalot & García-Rodríguez
Amphora cimbrica Østrup
Amphora cimbrica var. tenuis Levkov
Amphora cingulata Cleve
Amphora cingulata Pantocsek
Amphora cingulata var. hyalina M.M.Salah
Amphora clathrata A.Mann
Amphora clevei Grunow
Amphora coarcta G.Leuduger-Fortmorel
Amphora coarctata G.Leuduger-Fortmorel
Amphora coffaeiformis (C.Agardh) Kützing
Amphora coffeiformis f. curta Poretzky & Anissimova
Amphora coffeiformis f. subconstricta (Grunow) Zabelina
Amphora coffeiformis var. africana F.E.Fritsch & M.F.Rich
Amphora coffeiformis var. africana f. kurze Venkataraman
Amphora coffeiformis var. asiatica F.Meister
Amphora coffeiformis var. bhusavalensis P.T.Sarode & N.D.Kamat
Amphora coffeiformis var. exigue (W.Gregory) G.Rabenhorst
Amphora coffeiformis var. fischeri Kützing
Amphora coffeiformis var. fossilis (Pantocsek) Cleve
Amphora coffeiformis var. fossilis Pantocsek
Amphora coffeiformis var. hungarica Cleve
Amphora coffeiformis var. protracta (Pantocsek) Cleve
Amphora coffeiformis var. salinarum Grunow
Amphora coffeiformis var. tenuissima Proshkina-Lavrenko
Amphora coffeiformis var. thumensis Ant.Mayer
Amphora cognata B.J.Cholnoky
Amphora commutata Grunow
Amphora commutata f. constricta Liebetanz
Amphora commutata var. constricta K.S.Mereschkowsky
Amphora commutata var. fossilis (Pantocsek) Cleve
Amphora comorensis Cleve
Amphora compacta A.Mann
Amphora composita C.Janisch
Amphora confusa Levkov & Metzeltin
Amphora conjuncta Pantocsek
Amphora conserta (Lewis) Grunow
Amphora constricta (Ehrenberg) W.Carruthers
Amphora contorta G.Leuduger-Fortmorel
Amphora contracta Grunow
Amphora copulata (Kützing) Schoeman & R.E.M.Archibald
Amphora copulatoides J.G.Stepanek & Kociolek
Amphora corinata Ehrenberg
Amphora corpulenta Cleve & Grove
Amphora corpulenta var. capitata Tempere & Maurice Peragallo
Amphora costata var. inflata (Grunow) H.Peragallo & M.Peragallo
Amphora costulata Skvortzow (Skvortsov)
Amphora crassa W.Gregory
Amphora crassa var. antarctica Maurice Peragallo
Amphora crassa var. campechiana Grunow
Amphora crassa var. degenerate Cleve
Amphora crassa var. elongata Cleve
Amphora crassa var. gemmata A.Jurilj
Amphora crassa var. incurva Grunow
Amphora crassa var. interlineata (Grove & G.Sturt) Cleve
Amphora crassa var. interrupta J.-M.Lin & T.G.Chin
Amphora crassa var. minor Pantocsek
Amphora crassa var. modesta Cleve
Amphora crassa var. oceanica H.Heiden
Amphora crassa var. punctata Grunow
Amphora crassa var. seychellensis Cleve
Amphora crassa var. soelswigiensis (P.C.M.Petit) Cleve
Amphora crassa var. spuria Cleve
Amphora crawfordii Levkov & Metzeltin
Amphora crenulata A.H.Wachnicka & E.E.Gaiser
Amphora crescens A.Mann
Amphora crispans Pomazkina & E.V.Rodionova
Amphora cristata Petit
Amphora cristodentata Skabichevskii (Skabitschevsky)
Amphora cruciata Østrup
Amphora crucifera A.Cleve
Amphora cruciferoides Stoermer & J.J.Yang
Amphora crystallina Ehrenberg
Amphora cucumaris A.Mann
Amphora cuneatiformis Levkov & Kristic
Amphora curvata Pantocsek
Amphora cyclops G.Leuduger-Fortmorel
Amphora cymbamphora Cholnoky
Amphora cymbaphora Cholnoky
Amphora cymbelloides var. mauritiana Grunow
Amphora cymbellula K.S.Mereschkowsky
Amphora cymbifera A.W.F.Schmidt
Amphora cymbifera var. heritierarum A.H.Wachnicka & E.E.Gaiser
Amphora cymbifera var. rara Frenguelli
Amphora cymbiformis Cleve
Amphora cymbiformis Ehrenberg
Amphora czekehazensis Pantocsek

D

Amphora dalaica Skvortzov
Amphora dalaica var. cornuta Skvortzov
Amphora dalaica var. gracilis Skvortzov
Amphora dalaica var. hinganica Skvortzov
Amphora dalaica var. oculata Skvortzov
Amphora de-tonii J.-J.Brun
Amphora debyi G.Leuduger-Fortmorel
Amphora decipiens Grunow
Amphora decloitrei A.Amossé
Amphora decloitrei var. rufisquiana A.Amossé
Amphora decora F.S.Castracane degli Antelminelli
Amphora decussata var. briocensis G.Leuduger-Fortmorel
Amphora deflecta G.W.Andrews
Amphora delicatissima Krasske
Amphora delicatula L.S.Bljumina
Amphora delphina L.W.Bailey
Amphora delphinea Cleve
Amphora delphinea var. jamalinensis (Cleve & Grunow) Cleve
Amphora delphinea var. minor Cleve
Amphora delphineiformis Levkov
Amphora delta G.Karst
Amphora densestriata Stoermer & J.J.Yang
Amphora densistriata Hajós
Amphora dentata Edlund & Levkov
Amphora diaphana Cleve
Amphora dichotoma A.Mann
Amphora difficilis Levkov
Amphora digitus A.W.F.Schmidt
Amphora dissimilis Metzeltin & Krammer
Amphora distincta Héribaud-Joseph
Amphora divisa G.Leuduger-Fortmorel
Amphora domkeana A.Jurilj
Amphora donkinii Rabenhorst
Amphora dorsalis Cleve & Grove
Amphora dubia W.Gregory
Amphora dura A.Mann
Amphora duseni J.-J.Brun
Amphora duseni f. simplex Krasske

E

Amphora eatoniana O'Meara
Amphora ectorii Levkov
Amphora edlundii Levkov
Amphora egregia Ehrenberg
Amphora egregia var. neogradensis Pantocsek
Amphora ehta G.Karst
Amphora elegans H.Peragallo
Amphora elegantula Hustedt
Amphora elongata Gregory
Amphora enoculata Héribaud-Joseph
Amphora epiphytica Skvortzov
Amphora epsilon G.Karst
Amphora erebi Ehrenberg
Amphora erezii Reimer & Lee
Amphora ergadensis Gregory
Amphora eulensteinii var. fossilis Pantocsek
Amphora eunotia var. baltica A.Cleve
Amphora eunotia var. gigantea Grunow
Amphora eunotia var. japonica Skvortzov (Skvortsow)
Amphora eunotia var. striolata Frenguelli
Amphora eunotiaeformis Grunow
Amphora euprepes Pantocsek
Amphora evanida M.H.Giffen
Amphora excisa Gregory
Amphora excludens A.Mann
Amphora exiliata Giffen
Amphora exilissima M.H.Giffen
Amphora exilitata M.H.Giffen
Amphora eximia J.R.Carter
Amphora exornata Janisch
Amphora exsecta Grunow
Amphora extensa Salah

F

Amphora fallax J.A.Tempère & J.-J.Brun
Amphora farcimen Grunow
Amphora farcimen var. crassa M.Peragallo
Amphora farcimen var. gigantea M.Peragallo
Amphora farciminosa M.Peragallo
Amphora favus E.V.Rodionova & Pomazkina
Amphora ferrazae B.J.Cholnoky
Amphora fimbriata Cleve & Grove
Amphora finlandica Levkov
Amphora fischeri (Kützing) Kützing
Amphora flammiger G.Leuduger-Fortmorel
Amphora flebilis R.Simonsen
Amphora flexa A.Mann
Amphora flexuosa Grev.
Amphora floridae A.H.Wachnicka & E.E.Gaiser
Amphora fluminensis Grunow
Amphora fluminensis var. curta R.d'Aubert
Amphora fonticola Maillard
Amphora formosa Cleve
Amphora formosa G.Leuduger-Fortmorel
Amphora formosa var. minuta Cleve
Amphora fossilis Pantocsek
Amphora foveauxiana F.J.R.Taylor
Amphora francescae M.H.Giffen
Amphora furcata G.Leuduger-Fortmorel
Amphora fusca f. lata M.Peragallo

G

Amphora gamma G.Karst
Amphora gamtoosae M.H.Giffen
Amphora geinitzii Heiden
Amphora gemmifera P.C.M.Petit
Amphora genkalii Gusliakov
Amphora gibberula Missuna
Amphora gieskesii B.J.Cholnoky
Amphora gigantea Grunow
Amphora gigantea f. minor Cleve
Amphora gigantea var. andesitica Pantocsek
Amphora gigantea var. fusca (A.W.F.Schmidt) Cleve
Amphora gigantea var. gigantea Grunow ex A.W.F.Schmidt
Amphora gigantea var. obscura Cleve
Amphora globosa Schumann
Amphora globosa var. perpusilla Grunow
Amphora globulosa J.Schumann
Amphora gobii K.S.Mereschkowsky
Amphora gourdonii M.Peragallo
Amphora gouwsii B.J.Cholnoky
Amphora gracilis Ehrenberg
Amphora gracilis f. parva A.Truan y Luard
Amphora graeffeana Hendey
Amphora graeffei Grunow
Amphora graeffei var. minor Maurice Peragallo
Amphora graeffii var. staurophora Cleve
Amphora gramenorum A.H.Wachnicka & E.E.Gaiser
Amphora grammatica Pomazkina & E.V.Rodionova
Amphora granii Pantocsek
Amphora granularis Pomazkina & E.V.Rodionova
Amphora granulata var. biggibosa M.Ricard
Amphora granulata var. costata Proshkina-Lavrenko
Amphora granulata var. lineata M.Peragallo
Amphora granulata var. punctata Proshkina-Lavrenko
Amphora granulifera Cleve
Amphora gregorii Ralfs
Amphora gregoryi Ralfs
Amphora grevilleana W.Gregory
Amphora grevilleana var. campechiana Grunow
Amphora grevilleana var. contracta Cleve
Amphora grevilleana var. indentata M.Ricard
Amphora grevilleana var. prominens Grunow
Amphora grevilleana var. sepulta Pantocsek
Amphora grevilliana W.Gregory
Amphora grevilliana var. complexa (W.Gregory) G.Rabenhorst
Amphora grevilliana var. fasciata (W.Gregory) G.Rabenhorst
Amphora groenlandica Cleve
Amphora groenlandica Østrup
Amphora grovei Cleve
Amphora gruendleri Grunow
Amphora gruendleri var. approximata Cleve
Amphora gruendleri var. robusta Cleve
Amphora gruendlerii var. trachytica Pantocsek
Amphora grunowii A.W.F.Schmidt
Amphora guinardii Maurice Peragallo
Amphora guinense G.Leuduger-Fortmorel
Amphora gulfusiis M.M.Salah & Tamás

H

Amphora hamata Heiden
Amphora hassiaca Krammer & S.Strecker
Amphora helenensis Giffen
Amphora hemicycla Stoermer & J.J.Yang
Amphora henshawii A.Mann
Amphora heterostriata Mereschkowski
Amphora hevesensis Pantocsek
Amphora hians J.H.L.Flögel
Amphora hidasensis Hajós
Amphora hilliardii Manguin
Amphora hinzae Levkov
Amphora hiromuii Nagumo
Amphora hirundinella J.-J.Brun
Amphora holsatica var. malayana G.A.Prowse
Amphora holsatica var. tenera N.I.Karaeva
Amphora holsatica var. ventrestriata Ø.Berg
Amphora holsatica var. ventrestriata f. pyriformis Ø.Berg
Amphora holsaticoides T.Nagumo & H.Kobayasi
Amphora honshuensis A.Mann
Amphora humicola Grunow
Amphora humicola var. javanica Grunow
Amphora hungarica P.Palik
Amphora huronensis Stoermer & J.J.Yang
Amphora hustedtii Levkov
Amphora hyalina Kützing
Amphora hyalina f. parvula Grunow
Amphora hyalina var. delicatula Proshkina-Lavrenko
Amphora hyalina var. impalpabilis A.I.Proshkina-Lavrenko
Amphora hyperborea Grunow

I

Amphora ignorata Levkov
Amphora ignota B.J.Cholnoky
Amphora immarginata Nagumo
Amphora impercepta F.Meister
Amphora imperfecta Manguin
Amphora inariensis Krammer
Amphora incerta A.W.F.Schmidt
Amphora incisa Hajós
Amphora inconspicua A.I.Proshkina-Lavrenko
Amphora incrassata M.H.Giffen
Amphora incredulata M.H.Giffen
Amphora incurva W.Gregory
Amphora incurvata J.R.Carter
Amphora indentata A.H.Wachnicka & E.E.Gaiser
Amphora indistincta Levkov
Amphora inelegans Cleve & Grove
Amphora inelegans var. polita Cleve
Amphora inflata Grunow
Amphora inornata Cleve
Amphora insolita Pomazkina & E.V.Rodionova
Amphora interlineata Grove & G.Sturt
Amphora intersecta A.W.F.Schmidt
Amphora intersecta var. sarmatica Pantocsek
Amphora intersecta var. striata Pantocsek
Amphora invidenda Pantocsek

J

Amphora jacksoni Schrader
Amphora jamaliensis var. fossilis Pantocsek
Amphora janischii A.W.F.Schmidt
Amphora japonica F.Meister
Amphora javanica A.W.F.Schmidt
Amphora javanica var. oculata M.Peragallo
Amphora javorkaae Szemes
Amphora jeniseyensis Skvortzov
Amphora jeschkei C.Janisch
Amphora jostesorum Witkowski, Lange-Bertalot & Metzeltin

K

Amphora kamorthensis Grunow
Amphora kamorthensis f. minor Grunow
Amphora karajevae Gusliakov
Amphora katii Selva
Amphora kenyaensis F.Gasse
Amphora kerguelensis H.Heiden
Amphora kertschiana Pantocsek
Amphora kittonii G.Leuduger-Fortmorel
Amphora kolbei Skvortzov
Amphora koshovii Skabichevskij
Amphora kossuthii Pantocsek
Amphora krammeri Levkov & Metzeltin

L

Amphora labuensis Cleve
Amphora labuensis var. fusiformis G.Leuduger-Fortmorel
Amphora labyrinthica Grunow
Amphora lacinia A.H.Wachnicka & E.E.Gaiser
Amphora lacustris R.E.M.Archibald
Amphora laevis W.Gregory
Amphora laevis var. minuta Cleve
Amphora laevis var. perminuta (Grunow) Cleve
Amphora laevis var. producta Mereschkowski
Amphora laevissima W.Gregory
Amphora lagerheimii P.Cleve
Amphora lagerheimii var. minuta Playfair
Amphora lanceolata Ehrenberg
Amphora lanceolata var. angustissima (Van Heurck) M.Peragallo
Amphora lanceolata var. aperta M.Peragallo
Amphora lanceolata var. incurvata J.-J.Brun
Amphora lanceolata var. minor Cleve
Amphora lanceolata var. perlonga Maurice Peragallo
Amphora lanceolata var. robusta M.Peragallo
Amphora lange-bertalotii Levkov & Metzeltin
Amphora lange-bertalotii var. tenuis Levkov & Metzeltin
Amphora langebaanae M.H.Giffen
Amphora latecingulata M.Peragallo
Amphora leeana S.Mayama & T.Nagumo
Amphora leighsmithiana O'Meara
Amphora lepta Schrader
Amphora leudugeriana Petit
Amphora leudugeriana var. intermedia Maurice Peragallo
Amphora leudugeriana var. minor Maurice Peragallo
Amphora levenensis E.Y.Haworth
Amphora libyca Ehrenberg
Amphora libyca f. minor Gutwinski
Amphora libyca var. baltica (Brander) Cleve-Euler
Amphora libyca var. gigas Ehrenberg
Amphora libyca var. interrupta Pantocsek
Amphora lima Pantocsek
Amphora lima var. fossilis Pantocsek
Amphora limbata Cleve & Grove
Amphora limpidus C.Janisch
Amphora lindbergii A.Cleve
Amphora linearis Meister
Amphora lineata f. minor Grunow
Amphora lineata var. constricta Grunow
Amphora lineolata Ehrenberg
Amphora lineolata Ehrenberg
Amphora lineolata f. sparsestriata A.Berg
Amphora lineolata var. calamae Frenguelli
Amphora lineolata var. chinensis (A.W.F.Schmidt) Cleve
Amphora lineolata var. sinensis (A.W.F.Schmidt) Cleve
Amphora lineolata var. undata (H.L.Smith) Cleve
Amphora lingulata K.S.Mereschkowsky
Amphora liococca Ehrenberg
Amphora liouvillei M.Peragallo
Amphora liriope Nagumo
Amphora litoralis var. fossilis Pantocsek
Amphora loczyi Pantocsek
Amphora longa Hustedt
Amphora longiceps R.Simonsen
Amphora lunaris A.Mann
Amphora lunaris F.Meister
Amphora lunata Østrup
Amphora lunatiformis Levkov
Amphora lunula Cleve
Amphora lunula var. parvula H.Heiden
Amphora lunulata A.H.Wachnicka & E.E.Gaiser
Amphora lunyacsekii Pantocsek
Amphora lutea G.Leuduger-Fortmorel
Amphora luteum A.H.Wachnicka & E.E.Gaiser
Amphora lybica f. major Frenguelli
Amphora lybica var. cymbiformis Frenguelli
Amphora lybica var. vittata A.Cleve
Amphora lydiae Gusliakov

M

Amphora macedoniensis Nagumo
Amphora macilenta var. elongata Maurice Peragallo
Amphora macilenta var. ergadensis (Gregory) Cleve
Amphora macilenta var. macilenta Gregory
Amphora macilenta var. maeotica Pr.-Lavrenko
Amphora macilenta var. typica Cleve
Amphora maeandrina Cleve
Amphora maeotica Pantocsek
Amphora magellanica P.C.M.Petit
Amphora magellanica var. tristani A.Cleve
Amphora magna Levkov
Amphora magnifica Grev.
Amphora maharashtrensis P.T.Sarode & N.D.Kamat
Amphora makarovae Gusliakov
Amphora maletracta Simonsen
Amphora manifesta J.G.Stepanek & Kociolek
Amphora mansiensis Foged
Amphora maracaiboensis Levkov
Amphora marchesettiana Pantocsek
Amphora margalefii X.Tomàs
Amphora margalefii var. lacustris P.Sanchez
Amphora margaritifera Cleve
Amphora marginata Østrup
Amphora maria G.D.Hanna & W.M.Grant
Amphora marina W.Smith
Amphora marina var. minima Cleve-Euler
Amphora megapora Pantocsek
Amphora meisteri S.L.VanLandingham
Amphora membranacea W.Smith
Amphora memorabilis Pomazkina & E.V.Rodionova
Amphora meneghiniana Castracane
Amphora menisca M.H.Hohn & J.Hellerman
Amphora meridionalis Levkov
Amphora metzeltinii Levkov
Amphora mexicana A.W.F.Schmidt
Amphora mexicana var. boryana Pantocsek
Amphora mexicana var. fusca Cleve
Amphora mexicana var. major (Cleve) Cleve-Euler
Amphora mexicana var. minor Skvortzov
Amphora mexicana var. schmidtiana Van Heurck
Amphora micans A.W.F.Schmidt
Amphora michiganensis Stoermer & J.J.Yang
Amphora micra Levkov
Amphora micrometra Giffen
Amphora milesiana Gregory
Amphora minuscula Frenguelli
Amphora minuta Pantocsek
Amphora minuta var. interrupta M.Hajós
Amphora minutissima W.Smith
Amphora minutissima var. africana Levkov
Amphora miramaris Frenguelli
Amphora monglica Oestrup
Amphora mongolica Østrup
Amphora mongolica f. interrupta Skvortzov
Amphora mongolica var. cornuta Skvortzow (Skvortsov)
Amphora mongolica var. gracilis Skvortzow (Skvortsov)
Amphora mongolica var. maculata Skvortzov
Amphora monilifera Gregory
Amphora montgomeryi A.H.Wachnicka & E.E.Gaiser
Amphora mucronata H.L.Smith
Amphora muelleri A.W.F.Schmidt
Amphora multigramma M.H.Hohn & J.Hellerman
Amphora munda A.W.F.Schmidt
Amphora mutabunda Manguin

N

Amphora nagornaya Pomazkina & E.V.Rodionova
Amphora nagpurensis P.T.Sarode & N.D.Kamat
Amphora nagumoi Levkov & Pavlov
Amphora nana W.Gregory
Amphora nana f. parva A.W.F.Schmidt
Amphora natalensis B.J.Cholnoky
Amphora naumannii C.Janisch
Amphora naviculacea A.S.Donkin
Amphora navicularis Ehrenberg
Amphora naviformis G.Leuduger-Fortmorel
Amphora neglecta Stoermer & J.J.Yang
Amphora neglecta f. densestriata Foged
Amphora neglectiformis Levkov & Edlund
Amphora neomarina T.V.Desikachary & P.Prema
Amphora neupauerii Pantocsek
Amphora nilotica Ehrenberg
Amphora nipponica Levkov
Amphora nobilis Gregory
Amphora nodosa J.-J.Brun
Amphora normani var. gibbosa Skvortzov
Amphora normani var. undulata Krasske
Amphora novaecaledonica var. hungarica Pantocsek
Amphora novaeguineae B.J.Cholnoky
Amphora nuda G.Leuduger-Fortmorel
Amphora nuwukiana var. arctica R.M.Patrick & L.R.Freese

O

Amphora oamaruensis Schrader
Amphora obesa Cleve & Grove
Amphora oblonga Gregory
Amphora obscura var. diminuta Krasske
Amphora obtecta Bailey
Amphora obtusa W.Gregory
Amphora obtusa f. distinguenda A.I.Proshkina-Lavrenko
Amphora obtusa f. minuta Cleve
Amphora obtusa f. miocena J.-J.Brun
Amphora obtusa var. baicalensis Jasnitsky
Amphora obtusa var. fossilis Pantocsek
Amphora obtusa var. lunyacsekii (Pantocsek) Cleve
Amphora obtusa var. oamaruensis Schrader
Amphora obtusa var. oceanica (Castracane) Cleve
Amphora obtusa var. permagna (Pantocsek) Mills
Amphora obtusa var. radula Cleve
Amphora obtusa var. rectangularis H.Peragallo
Amphora obtusa var. rectangulata H.Peragallo & M.Peragallo
Amphora obtusa var. skvortzowii S.L.VanLandingham
Amphora obtusa var. transfuga Cleve
Amphora obtusa var. typica (Cleve) Cleve-Euler
Amphora obtusaeformis B.J.Cholnoky
Amphora occidentalis A.Amossé
Amphora ocellata Donkin
Amphora ocellata var. hyalina Skvortzov
Amphora ocellata var. interrupta (Pantocsek) Cleve
Amphora ocellata var. oamaruensis Cleve
Amphora ocellata var. quadrangulata K.S.Mereschkowsky
Amphora ocellata var. singulata Cleve
Amphora ocellata var. typica Cleve
Amphora oculus A.W.F.Schmidt
Amphora oculus var. farcimen (A.W.F.Schmidt) Cleve
Amphora oculus var. fossilis Pantocsek
Amphora ognjanovae Metzeltin & Levkov
Amphora ohridana Levkov
Amphora okawangoi B.J.Cholnoky
Amphora oncliniorum (Compère) Krammer
Amphora ornata G.Leuduger-Fortmorel
Amphora ornata var. rectangulata (A.Cleve) A.Cleve
Amphora oscitans Frenguelli
Amphora ostrearia Brébisson ex Kützing
Amphora ostrearia var. beguinotii V.Zanon
Amphora ostrearia var. interrupta Pantocsek
Amphora ostrearia var. lineata Cleve
Amphora ostrearia var. minor Grunow
Amphora ostrearia var. porcellus (F.Kitton) Cleve
Amphora ostrearia var. quadrata (L.A.Brébisson) G.Rabenhorst
Amphora ostrearia var. typica Cleve
Amphora ostrearia var. vitrea Cleve
Amphora ostreata Brébisson
Amphora ovalis (Kützing) Kützing - type
Amphora ovalis f. angusta Ant.Mayer
Amphora ovalis f. elliptica G.Rabenhorst
Amphora ovalis f. globosa (J.Schumann) Ant.Mayer
Amphora ovalis f. maior Istvanfy
Amphora ovalis f. major Istvanfy
Amphora ovalis f. minor (Grunow) Van Heurck
Amphora ovalis f. nana G.Rabenhorst
Amphora ovalis f. typica Cleve
Amphora ovalis var. baicalensis Skvortzov & K.I.Meyer
Amphora ovalis var. elliptica Rabenhorst
Amphora ovalis var. elongata A.Jurilj
Amphora ovalis var. elongata Østrup
Amphora ovalis var. gracilis (Ehrenberg) Van Heurck
Amphora ovalis var. hybrida (Grunow) Cleve
Amphora ovalis var. lata Levkov
Amphora ovalis var. minor H.H.Chase
Amphora ovalis var. minor Kützing
Amphora ovalis var. minor Rabenhorst
Amphora ovalis var. pediculis f. mongolica Skvortzov
Amphora ovalis var. perlonga F.Meister
Amphora ovalis var. rostrata K.S.Mereschkowsky
Amphora ovalis var. tenuis Levkov
Amphora ovalis var. typica (Cleve) F.Meister
Amphora ovalis var. viridis G.Karst
Amphora ovum Cleve

P

Amphora pagesi A.Lauby
Amphora pallida Frenguelli
Amphora pampaninii A.I.Forti
Amphora pannonica Hajós
Amphora pannucea M.H.Giffen
Amphora pantocseki M.Hajós
Amphora paracopulata Levkov & Edlund
Amphora paradoxa Ehrenberg
Amphora parallela J.H.L.Flögel
Amphora parallelistriata Manguin ex Kociolek & de Reviers
Amphora parallelistriata var. manguinii Foged
Amphora parva E.V.Rodionova & Pomazkina
Amphora parvula A.I.Proshkina-Lavrenko
Amphora pauca A.Mann
Amphora pavillardii Maurice Peragallo
Amphora pavimentum C.S.Boyer
Amphora pecten J.-J.Brun
Amphora pecten var. argus Cleve
Amphora pediculus (Kützing) Grunow
Amphora pediculus var. distincta A.Cleve
Amphora pediculus var. major Van Heurck
Amphora pediculus var. minor Grunow
Amphora pediculus var. nebulosa A.I.Proshkina-Lavrenko
Amphora pellucida W.Gregory
Amphora peraffinis Levkov
Amphora peragalloi Cleve
Amphora peragalloi Cleve
Amphora peragalloi var. balearica H.Peraragallo & M.Peragallo
Amphora peragallorum Van Heurck
Amphora peragallorum var. minor Maurice Peragallo
Amphora peragallorum var. parvula H.Heiden
Amphora peragallorum var. robusta H.F.Van Heurck
Amphora perstriata H.Peragallo & M.Peragallo
Amphora pestilenta M.H.Giffen
Amphora pesudoeximiformis E.V.Rodionova & Pomazkina
Amphora petermannii M.Peragallo
Amphora petiti J.A.Tempère & J.-J.Brun
Amphora petitii Leuduger-Fortmorel
Amphora philippinica F.S.Castracane degli Antelminelli
Amphora pimenteli M.Peragallo
Amphora piper B.J.Cholnoky
Amphora platensis Frenguelli
Amphora plativalvata Nagumo
Amphora pleurosigma J.A.Tempère & J.-J.Brun
Amphora plicata W.Gregory
Amphora pogrebnjakovii Gusliakov
Amphora polaris Østrup
Amphora polita Krasske
Amphora polonica Zelazna-Wieczorek & Lange-Bertalot
Amphora polycocca K.S.Mereschkowsky
Amphora polyzonata F.S.Castracane degli Antelminelli
Amphora pontica K.S.Mereschkowsky
Amphora porcellus F.Kitton
Amphora praelata Hendey
Amphora praevalida Janisch
Amphora prespanensis Levkov, Krstic & Metzeltin
Amphora prisca Cleve & Grove
Amphora prismatica Cleve
Amphora proboscidea W.Gregory
Amphora profusa M.H.Giffen
Amphora proschkiniana Gusliakov
Amphora proteoides Hustedt
Amphora proteoides f. varians Pr.-Lavrenko
Amphora proteus (Grunow) Zanon
Amphora proteus W.Gregory
Amphora proteus f. ambigua Pr.-Lavrenko
Amphora proteus f. lacunata A.Jurilj
Amphora proteus var. alata Cleve
Amphora proteus var. baikalensis Skvortzow (Skvortsov)
Amphora proteus var. contigua Cleve
Amphora proteus var. impressa Cleve-Euler
Amphora proteus var. kariana (A.Grunow) Grunow
Amphora proteus var. kariana Grunow
Amphora proteus var. laevistriata Cleve-Euler
Amphora proteus var. maxima H.Peragallo
Amphora proteus var. mexicana (A.W.F.Schmidt) Cleve
Amphora proteus var. minor Grunow
Amphora proteus var. nodosa A.Jurilj
Amphora proteus var. oculata H.Peragallo & M.Peragallo
Amphora proteus var. oculata f. nana Bodeanu
Amphora proteus var. robusta Skvortzov
Amphora proteus var. tenuissima Cleve-Euler
Amphora protracta Pantocsek
Amphora protracta var. gallica Héribaud-Joseph
Amphora prudentii Héribaud-Joseph
Amphora pseudaequalis Levkov
Amphora pseudoeximia Levkov
Amphora pseudoeximiformis E.V.Rodionova & Pomazkina
Amphora pseudoholsatica T.Nagumo & H.Kobayasi
Amphora pseudohyalina Simonsen
Amphora pseudomicra Pomazkina & E.V.Rodionova
Amphora pseudominutissima Levkov
Amphora pseudoproteus A.H.Wachnicka & E.E.Gaiser
Amphora pseudosibirica Levkov & Pavlov
Amphora pseudospectabilis Levkov
Amphora pseudotenuissima A.H.Wachnicka & E.E.Gaiser
Amphora puechi A.Lauby
Amphora pulchella H.Perag.& M.Perag.
Amphora punctata G.W.Andrews
Amphora punctata Schrader
Amphora pura Levkov
Amphora pusilla Gregory
Amphora pusio Cleve
Amphora pusio var. parvula (Flögel) H.Peragallo & M.Peragallo

Q

Amphora quadrangulata K.S.Mereschkowsky
Amphora quadrata Brébisson ex Kützing
Amphora quadrata Gregory

R

Amphora racovitzae van Heurck
Amphora ramsbottomi M.M.Salah
Amphora ranomafanensis Manguin
Amphora recens Levkov & Nakov
Amphora recessa A.Mann
Amphora recondita Levkov & Nakov
Amphora recta (Gregory) Grunow
Amphora recta Leuduger-Fortmorel
Amphora rectangularis W.Gregory
Amphora rectilineata Cleve & Grove
Amphora recurva F.Meister
Amphora reinholdii G.D.Hanna
Amphora reniformis M.R.Sreenivasa & H.C.Duthie
Amphora reniformis Y.-Q.Guo, S.-Q.Xie & J.-S.Li
Amphora revirescens Pantocsek
Amphora rhombica var. gracilior Cleve
Amphora rhombica var. sinica Skvortzow
Amphora richardiana B.J.Cholnoky
Amphora rimosa Ehrenberg
Amphora rimosa hyalina Ehrenberg
Amphora robertsonii A.C.Podzorski
Amphora robusta W.Gregory
Amphora robusta var. brevistriata A.Cleve
Amphora robusta var. fusca Cleve
Amphora robusta var. hemicostata H.Peragallo
Amphora robusta var. minor H.J.B.Juhlin-Dannfelt
Amphora robusta var. subplicata Cleve
Amphora roettgeri J.J.Lee & C.W.Reimer
Amphora rossii Hajós
Amphora rostrigera Frenguelli
Amphora rotunda Skvortzov (Skvortsow)
Amphora russica Pantocsek

S

Amphora sabyii Salah
Amphora salina var. capitata M.Peragallo
Amphora salina var. capitata R.dÕAubert
Amphora salina var. fossilis Pantocsek
Amphora salsa Patrick & Freese
Amphora samoensis M.Peragallo
Amphora sanctenectairense Rochoux d'Aubert
Amphora sancti-martiali M.Peragallo
Amphora sancti-martiali var. faureli A.Amossé
Amphora sancti-naumii Levkov & Metzeltin
Amphora sarniensis Grev.
Amphora sarniensis var. flexuosa (Grev.) Cleve
Amphora scala Cleve & Grove
Amphora scala var. alata Cleve
Amphora scalaris F.S.Castracane degli Antelminelli
Amphora scardica Levkov
Amphora schleinitzii C.Janisch
Amphora schmidtii Grunow
Amphora schmidtii f. major Cleve
Amphora schmidtii f. minor Cleve
Amphora schmidtii var. alata Cleve
Amphora schmidtii var. minor H.Peragallo
Amphora schmidtii var. schleinitzii (C.Janisch) Cleve
Amphora scopulorum M.H.Giffen
Amphora sculpta Frenguelli
Amphora scutella A.H.Wachnicka & E.E.Gaiser
Amphora sejuncta Pantocsek
Amphora semen Ehrenberg
Amphora semi-ovum Leuduger-Fortmorel
Amphora seminuda F.Meister
Amphora semperpalorum A.H.Wachnicka & E.E.Gaiser
Amphora sendaiana J.-J.Brun
Amphora senonquei M.Peragallo
Amphora separanda H.Peragallo & M.Peragallo
Amphora septentrionalis Østrup
Amphora serrata Skabichevskii (Skabitschevsky)
Amphora serrataeformis Levkov
Amphora sibirica Skvortzow & K.I.Meyer
Amphora sima A.Mann
Amphora similis Levkov
Amphora simplex G.Leuduger-Fortmorel
Amphora sinuata Grev.
Amphora skvortzowii Levkov
Amphora soelsvigiensis P.C.M.Petit
Amphora somalica Frenguelli
Amphora soninkhishigiae Edlund, Shinneman & Levkov
Amphora spartinetensis Sullivan & C.W.Reimer
Amphora spectabilis W.Gregory
Amphora splendida P.Rivera
Amphora spriggerica A.H.Wachnicka & E.E.Gaiser
Amphora staubii Pantocsek
Amphora staurohyalina A.C.Podzorski & H.Håkansson
Amphora staurophora Castracane
Amphora staurophora Pantocsek
Amphora stechlinensis Levkov & Metzeltin
Amphora stoermeri Edlund & Levkov
Amphora strangulata G.Leuduger-Fortmorel
Amphora streckerae Krammer
Amphora striata K.E.Eichwald
Amphora striata M.Hajós
Amphora strigata Pantocsek
Amphora studeri C.Janisch
Amphora sturtii Grunow
Amphora suavis Pantocsek
Amphora subacutiuscula Schoeman
Amphora subaequalis Levkov
Amphora subatomus Levkov
Amphora subconstricta Levkov
Amphora subcostulata Stoermer & J.J.Yang
Amphora subelliptica K.S.Mereschkowsky
Amphora subhyalina A.C.Podzorski & H.Håkansson
Amphora subinflata Grunow ex A.W.F.Schmidt
Amphora sublaevis Hustedt
Amphora submontana var. ebroicensis R.Maillard
Amphora subovalis Renault ex Lauby
Amphora subpunctata Grove & G.Sturt
Amphora subrobusta Hustedt
Amphora subrobusta var. pliocenica Frenguelli
Amphora subrotunda Levkov
Amphora subtilissima R.Simonsen
Amphora subtropica A.H.Wachnicka & E.E.Gaiser
Amphora subturbida Levkov
Amphora subulata M.Peragallo
Amphora sulcata A.W.F.Schmidt
Amphora sulcata f. parva A.W.F.Schmidt
Amphora sumatrensis G.Leuduger-Fortmorel
Amphora szaboi Pantocsek

T

Amphora tanganyikae Caljon
Amphora tasmanica W.Vyverman, Sabbe, R.Vyverman, Hodgon & Muylaert
Amphora tegetum A.H.Wachnicka & E.E.Gaiser
Amphora tenarescens Cholnoky
Amphora tenellula M.H.Giffen
Amphora tenerascens B.J.Cholnoky
Amphora tenuis J.H.L.Flögel
Amphora tenuissima Hustedt
Amphora tenuissima M.H.Giffen
Amphora tenuistriata Manguin
Amphora terroris var. limbata Cleve
Amphora terroris var. rara (Frenguelli) S.L.VanLandingham
Amphora tertiaria Pantocsek
Amphora tessellata Grove & G.Sturt
Amphora testudinata M.H.Hohn & J.Hellerman
Amphora teta G.Karst
Amphora tetragibba Cleve
Amphora thaitiana F.S.Castracane degli Antelminelli
Amphora thromboliticola Cocquyt
Amphora tibestiensis Amosse
Amphora timida Hustedt
Amphora tithoniana Pantocsek
Amphora tomassiniana Pantocsek
Amphora tomiakae Witkowski, Lange-Bertalot & Metzeltin
Amphora topaschevskii Gusliakov
Amphora torontoensis M.R.Sreenivasa & H.C.Duthie
Amphora tortonica M.Hajós
Amphora towutensis Hustedt
Amphora transcaspica (J.B.Petersen) A.Dulmaa
Amphora transfixa F.Meister
Amphora transsylvanica Jurilj
Amphora transylvanica Pantocsek
Amphora trasilvancia Pantocsek
Amphora treubii G.Leuduger-Fortmorel
Amphora triseriata M.Ricard
Amphora tropidoneioides M.M.Salah
Amphora truncata Cleve
Amphora truncata W.Gregory
Amphora truncata var. brevis Bodeanu
Amphora tumidula Grunow
Amphora tumulifer A.Mann
Amphora turbida Levkov
Amphora turbida var. neothaumae Levkov
Amphora turgida f. minor M.Peragallo
Amphora turgida var. ceylonica Skvortzov
Amphora turgida var. parallela H.Heiden
Amphora twenteana Krammer

U

Amphora uncinatum (Ehrenberg) Edwards
Amphora undata G.Leuduger-Fortmorel
Amphora undata H.L.Smith
Amphora undulata Grev.

V

Amphora vadosinii A.H.Wachnicka & E.E.Gaiser
Amphora valida H.Peragallo
Amphora variabilis T.F.Kozyrenko
Amphora vaughanii M.H.Giffen
Amphora veneta f. globulosa Foged
Amphora veneta var. angularis Stoermer
Amphora veneta var. gibbosa Frenguelli
Amphora veneta var. grossestriata Playfair
Amphora veneta var. indica Skvortzov
Amphora veneta var. minor Frenguelli
Amphora veneta var. veneta Kützing
Amphora veneziana K.S.Mereschkowsky
Amphora venusta Østrup
Amphora verrucosa Pantocsek
Amphora vetula Levkov
Amphora vetula f. perforata E.V.Rodionova & Pomazkina
Amphora vetula f. simila Pomazkina & E.V.Rodionova
Amphora vetula var. baikalensis Levkov
Amphora vetusta Cleve
Amphora virgata Østrup
Amphora virgata var. crassa M.Peragallo
Amphora vitra Cleve
Amphora vitrea Cleve
Amphora vittata Pantocsek
Amphora vixvisibilis Chunlian Li & Witkowski
Amphora vulgaris Ehrenberg

W

Amphora wachenhusenii C.Janisch
Amphora waldeniana J.G.Stepanek & Kociolek
Amphora wandelensis P.C.M.Petit
Amphora weinekii C.Janisch
Amphora weissflogii A.W.F.Schmidt
Amphora wiesnerii Pantocsek
Amphora wittsteinii C.Janisch

Z

Amphora zebrata J.A.Tempère & J.-J.Brun
Amphora zebrina A.W.F.Schmidt
Amphora zeta G.Karst

References

Diatom genera
Thalassiophysales
Taxa named by Friedrich Traugott Kützing